Frederick Wilhelm von Pfalz-Neuburg (20 July 1665 – 23 July 1689), was by birth Count Palatine of Neuburg and Imperial General.

Life
Born in Düsseldorf, he was the tenth child but seventh son of Philip William, Elector Palatine and Landgravine Elisabeth Amalie of Hesse-Darmstadt.

Initially destined to the Church, in 1677 he was appointed Coadjutor and in 1685 Canon in Konstanz. Also, he studied at the Heidelberg University, where he was Rector in 1685.

Later, Frederick Wilhelm abandoned the church career and entered the Imperial army, where he obtained the rank of General. He fell in the Nine Years' War during the Siege of Mainz (1689), where, during a visit in the trenches, an arquebus shot to the head killed him instantly. He was buried in St. Andrew's Church, Düsseldorf.

Notes

References
Gustav Prümm, Ein Gewinn fürs ganze Leben, Books on Demand, 2009, p. 120
Johann Samuel Ersch, Allgemeine Encyclopädie der Wissenschaften und Künste, J. f. Gleditsch, 1847, p. 23 on-line

Ancestry

1665 births
1689 deaths
Military personnel from Düsseldorf
House of Wittelsbach
Military personnel of the Holy Roman Empire
Nobility from Düsseldorf
Sons of monarchs